Dunamis International Gospel Centre (DIGC), is a church headquartered in Abuja, Nigeria, with Dr. Paul and Dr. Becky Enenche, as the senior pastors.

History 
Dunamis International Gospel Centre was established on November 10, 1996. The first Sunday service was held at the Abuja Center for Arts and Culture. A church service was held there for two weeks before the church moved to the Abuja Sheraton Hotel & Towers, where worship took place for about six months. The church moved to its own worship location at Area 1, beside the Old Federal Secretariat in Abuja, in June 1997, less than a year after the ministry started. The ministry has several branches worldwide.

Glory Dome 

On November 24, 2018, the new international church headquarters, known as the Glory Dome (or glory sanctuary), was dedicated. It has a 100,000 capacity auditorium, 

The Glory Dome is located on the airport road in Abuja, Nigeria. The building sits on an expanse of land referred to as the Lord's Garden, situated on the airport road in Abuja, Nigeria. Its foundation was laid on September 14, 2014, and construction took four years from 2014 to 2018 with its roof done by Geometrica Incorporated.

The Glory Dome has five major entrances, two long galleries and an expansive pulpit. Its yellow-coloured roof spans 228 metres and covers 22,148 square metres – over two hectares (five acres) without an interior column. Other facilities situated on the same grounds include Rose of Sharon Gardens, Still Water Restaurant, Destiny Christian Academy (a Boarding and Day School), Pastors' Quarters and a Water Fountain.

TV and Radio 
Dunamis has a television and radio series titled "Destiny Encounter." The ministry of this outspoken commission also has its own satellite television station in Nigeria called Dunamis TV and radio which can also be streamed online. Dunamis TV has millions of viewers worldwide.

Academy 
The commission has its own bible training program known as the Dunamis School of Ministry (DUSOM), to train future leaders and pastors.

Publications 
Dunamis has a daily devotional book called Seeds of Destiny, Paul Enenche and Becky Enenche, are the co-authors. The Seed of Destiny is designed to grow the Christian faith, printed every month by Destiny publications, a publication house owned by the church.

See also 
 Bible
 Born again
 Jesus Christ
 Worship service (evangelicalism)
 Healing

External links 
 dunamisgospel.org official website of Dunamis International Gospel Centre

References 



Christian denominations in Africa
Christian denominations in Nigeria
Charismatic denominations
Evangelical megachurches in Nigeria
Christian organizations established in 1996
Organizations based in Abuja
Pentecostal denominations established in the 20th century